The Canadian Challenge Trophy in 1928 was an interprovincial soccer competition contested as a best of 3 games at Carruthers Park in Winnipeg, MB.  The finals were played on 28th and 30th of July and 1st of August, 1928.  The winners received the Canadian National Challenge Cup for that year.

Much of the details of the games including Westminster Royals were provided by Colin Jose.

Provincial qualification

BC Finals

National Competition

Bracket

BC/Alberta Finals

Western Canada Finals

National Finals

References

1928
Canadian Challenge Trophy
Challenge Trophy